Miller Crag is a bold and conspicuous outcropping of bare rock  high, standing  west-southwest of Sutley Peak in the western extremity of the Jones Mountains in Antarctica. It was mapped by the University of Minnesota Jones Mountains Party of 1960–61, who named it for Thomas P. Miller, a geologist with the party.

References

Cliffs of Ellsworth Land